Wisconsin Dells High School is a high school in Wisconsin Dells, Wisconsin. The only high school in the Wisconsin Dells School District, it serves the municipalities of Wisconsin Dells, Dell Prairie, Dellona, Delton, Jackson, Lake Delton, Lyndon, New Haven, Newport, and Springville.

References

External links
 Wisconsin Dells High School

Public high schools in Wisconsin
Schools in Columbia County, Wisconsin